The 1947 UC Santa Barbara Gauchos football team represented Santa Barbara College during the 1947 college football season.

Santa Barbara competed in the California Collegiate Athletic Association (CCAA). The team was led by third-year head coach Stan Williamson and played home games at La Playa Stadium in Santa Barbara, California. They finished the season with a record of four wins, three losses and one tie (4–3–1, 1–3–1 CCAA).

Schedule

Notes

References

Santa Barbara
UC Santa Barbara Gauchos football seasons
Santa Barbara Gauchos football